Hedotettix is a genus of insects found in China, belonging to the Tetrigidae family of Orthopterans.

Species 
 Hedotettix grossivalva
 Hedotettix xueshanensis
 Hedotettix brachynota

References 

Caelifera genera
Tetrigidae